When Women Rule the World is an announced reality television series originally announced to premiere on Fox Broadcasting in spring 2007, then pushed to June 2, 2008, then delayed again in April 2008. However, the show never aired in the United States.

The show consisted of 12 women and 12 men sent to a "primitive location" where the men were forced to be subservient to the women. The women voted off one man per week. The final man left was awarded $250,000. Cast members include Carla Turco, Jacky Reres, Karen Mangeney, Mike Babassi, Robbie Kaller. The show was hosted by Judi Shekoni.

The show was broadcast in Finland on MTV3 and in Belgium on PLUG RTL (summer 2010).

Cancellation
Mike Darnell, Fox's head of reality programming, explained that the series was shelved due to being dormant for too long. He commented: "[When Women Rule the World] will never make it [to the schedule]. Nothing's wrong with it, it just sat on the shelf too long. Sometimes things sit on the shelf too long and get old."

The series eventually aired in Finland.

Adaptation
The United Kingdom's Channel 4 negotiated with Fox for a license to make a British version of the show, which aired for eight weeks starting on 4 September 2008. The UK version was filmed in the Dominican Republic and hosted by Steve Jones.

The show consisted of eight women and ten men. Ed won the competition, beating G-Range in the final. His prize was £30,000.

See also
 List of television series canceled before airing an episode

References

"Fox's When Women Rule the World will have 'macho, chauvinistic guys' obeying women" by Andy Dehnart, 17 January 2007

External links 

Fox.com

2000s American reality television series
Feminism and society
Matriarchy
Television series by Rocket Science Laboratories
Unaired television shows